Alginet is a municipality in the comarca of Ribera Alta in the Valencian Community, Spain.

References

Municipalities in the Province of Valencia
Ribera Alta (comarca)